Kadrenci is a small settlement in the Municipality of Cerkvenjak in northeastern Slovenia. It lies in the Slovene Hills, on the south side of the regional road leading east from Cerkvenjak to Sveti Jurij ob Ščavnici. The area is part of the traditional region of Styria and is now included in the Drava Statistical Region.

References

External links
Kadrenci on Geopedia

Populated places in the Municipality of Cerkvenjak